FM Fukuyama (RADIO BINGO) is a Japanese local FM radio station in Fukuyama.

The station was founded on January 9, 1996, and went on the air on August 8, 1996.

External links
FM Fukuyama (RADIO BINGO)

Mass media in Fukuyama
Radio in Japan
Companies based in Hiroshima Prefecture
Radio stations established in 1996